The 2010 Ladbrokes.com World Darts Championship was the 17th World Championship organised by the Professional Darts Corporation since it separated from the British Darts Organisation. The event took place at Alexandra Palace in London from 18 December 2009 and 3 January 2010.

Phil Taylor successfully defended the title with a 7–3 victory over Simon Whitlock in the final. This was Taylor's thirteenth PDC world title, and his fifteenth in all.
Raymond van Barneveld recorded the second nine-dart finish in the history of the tournament in his second-round match against Brendan Dolan.

Format and qualifiers
The televised stages featured 72 players, an increase of 2 from last year. The top 32 players in the PDC Order of Merit on 1 December 2009 were seeded for the tournament. They were joined by the 16 highest non qualified players in the Players Championship Order of Merit from events played on the PDC Pro Tour.

 The final field as of 1 December 2009:

These 48 players were joined by 24 international players: the 4 highest names in the European Order of Merit not already qualified, the 3 highest names in the North American Order of Merit not already qualified and 15 further international qualifiers to be determined by the PDC and PDPA. Some of the players, such as the 4 from the European Order of Merit, the top 2 Americans, and Australian players are entered straight into the first round, while others, having won qualifying events in their countries, were entered into the preliminary round.

Order of Merit

Pro Tour
  Gary Anderson
  Paul Nicholson
  Andy Jenkins
  Peter Wright
  Brendan Dolan
  Steve Hine
  Kevin McDine
  Steve Brown
  Matt Clark
  Colin Monk
  Steve Maish
  Barrie Bates
  Mark Webster
  Toon Greebe
  Alex Roy
  Carlos Rodriguez

European Order of MeritFirst Round Qualifiers
  Andree Welge
  Mensur Suljović
  Dylan Duo
  Jyhan Artut

International QualifiersFirst Round Qualifiers
  Darin Young
  Scott Burnett
  Simon Whitlock
  Warren Parry

International QualifiersPreliminary Round Qualifiers
  Ken MacNeil
  Magnus Caris
  Les Francis
  Phillip Hazel
  Krzysztof Kciuk
  Osmann Kijamet
  Jarkko Komula
  Roman Konchikov
  Per Laursen
  Norman Madhoo
  Haruki Muramatsu
  Aodhagan O'Neill
  Ian Perez
  Jan van der Rassel
  Francisco Ruiz
  Tomas Seyler

Prize money
The 2010 World Championship featured a prize fund of £1,000,000 – a rise of £260,000 on the previous year, to become darts' first £1 million tournament. All rounds featured more money compared to 2009, and also sees a £10,000 highest checkout prize being to make the fund go up to a million.

In addition, the losing semi-finalists contested a third place play off match on the same night as the Final, played for an extra £20,000 "winner takes all" pot on top of the £40,000 they both already received for being losing semi finalists.  Therefore, third place won £60,000, and fourth place £40,000 – both an increase from last years £30,000 for the losing semi finalists.

The prize money is allocated as follows:

Draw

Preliminary round
The preliminary round draw was made on 29 November, and the format is best of 7 legs.

 Shi Yongsheng was originally drawn to play Tomas Seyler. However, he was forced to withdraw from the competition after he was unable to receive a visa to travel to the UK. Jan van der Rassel, the next non-qualified player from the Players Championship Order of Merit, took his place.

Last 64
The first round draw was made live on Sky Sports News on 7 December, and was conducted by Rod Harrington and Eric Bristow.

 All sets best of five legs, unless there is a final set tie-break. Match distances in sets are quoted at the top of each round of the bracket

Scores after player's names are three-dart averages (total points scored divided by darts thrown and multiplied by 3)
 All games that went to a final set had to be won by 2 clear legs, if after six more legs the players still couldn't be separated, a sudden death leg would take place to decide the winner, i.e. if the set goes to 5–5, a decider is played
 Mark Webster defeated Raymond van Barneveld 10 legs to 8 on 3 January in a 3rd/4th place playoff, the first time since 1998 such a playoff has occurred

Final

Statistics

Representation from different countries
This table shows the number of players by country in the World Championship, the total number including the preliminary round.

Television coverage
As they had done for every WDC/PDC World Darts Championship, Sky Sports provided coverage in the UK, broadcasting all 72 matches live in high-definition. Dave Clark presented the coverage with analysis from Rod Harrington and Eric Bristow. They also commentated on matches along with Sid Waddell, John Gwynne, Dave Lanning, Nigel Pearson, Rod Studd and Stuart Pyke. Interviews were either handled by Clark, Bristow or Studd.

Technical elements
Technical crew were supplied by Yorkshire-based Sports Event Services Limited, with Mark Leak heading up their crew and assuming the role of stage manager.

References

External links
 The official site of the Ladbrokes.com PDC World Darts Championship

2010
2009 in darts
2010 in darts
2010 in British sport
2009 sports events in London
2010 sports events in London
December 2009 sports events in the United Kingdom
January 2010 sports events in the United Kingdom
International sports competitions in London
Alexandra Palace